The 121st Secondary School or officially Comprehensive Secondary School No. 121 with Deep Learning of Foreign Languages of Prymorskyi Raion of Odesa Municipality  is an ordinary public school which provides compulsory and specialized education.

History 
The school was opened in 1937 and is located near the Odesa Orthodox Cathedral. The school building was built on a standard project (based on designs by architect L.B. Belkin).

English at the school has had deeper learning since 1954. The basic language of training is Ukrainian.

Specializations 
 English
 French
 Polish
 Russian
 Spanish (not active)

Principals 
 1944-1949: Fedchenko Zakharii Terentiiovych (1885-1955)
 1951-1966: Fedchuk Petro Lukych
 1966-1970: Stezhko Pavlo Mykolayovych
 1970-1973: Yevdoshenko Hanna Yakivna (1928—2007)
 1973-1989: Volkova Inna (Engelsina) Mykolaivna (1930—1990)
 Since 1989: Semeniuk Liudmyla Mykolaivna (1948)

External links 
  

Educational institutions established in 1937
Education in Odesa
Secondary schools in Ukraine
1937 establishments in the Soviet Union